Edward Łazikowski (born January 22, 1939, in Bąków Górny Poland) is a Polish artist whose work includes drawing, painting, photography, sculpture, installation art, performance art and art theory.

Life
Łazikowski graduated from the Strzemiński Academy of Fine Arts and Design in Łódź. He presents his artistic and theoretical achievements publicly in individual exhibitions and taking part in collective shows in galleries and museums, publishing catalogues and articles in various magazines, and giving interview.  Initially, he went in for painting (in the 1960s), then in the mid-1970s took interest in "actions" and photography (mainly documentary), and in the late 1970s and early 1980s performance art. Later on he created "objects" (sculptures): small constructions made of wood, string and fabric, which in time became larger, and sometimes became installations. An important part of his creative process is drawing, divided by the artist into three categories: free, working and note. Starting from the 1990s, he introduced a series of works called Fragtors. The term, coined by Łazikowski, and precisely described in his theoretical work Fragtoryzacja świata (Fragtorisation of the World), became the basis for artist's present plastic activities. In his theoretical and constructive works Łazikowski tries to combine discovering reality (science) with creating it (art). Łazikowski describes his aim as to carry out the "spiritualisation of his corporality (but not of the corpse), and corporalisation of his spirituality (but not of the spirit)." He sometimes exhibits his works outside galleries, at places unrelated to arts, not promoted by media and advertising campaigns; often outside the "field" of art.

Individual exhibitions

 1981: "Performance pikturalny", performance, Ślad Gallery, Łódź
 1986: "Obiekty", wystawa i pokaz autorski. instalacja. Galeria Stodoła, Warszawa
 1987: "2 instalacje i performance". Galeria Moltkerei-Verksttat. Kolonia, Niemcy
 1992: "Teraz i przedtem". Muzeum Artystów, Łódź
 1993: "Instalacje, obiekty, pokaz na żywo". Międzynarodowe Centrum Sztuki, Poznań

Collective exhibitions

 1981: "Panoptikon", instalacja, IX Spotkania Krakowskie, Kraków
 1987: "Realizm radykalny i abstrakcja konkretna", National Museum Warsaw
 1989: "Colori strappati - Oggetti presunti", Galeria Sala 1, Rzym, Włochy
 1990: "Konstrukcja w procesie", Central Museum of Textiles, Łódź
 1992: "Spotkanie i Tworzenie", Międzynarodowe Centrum Sztuki, Poznań

Works in collections

 National Museum, Warsaw
 Muzeum Sztuki w Łodzi
 Museum of Fine Arts
 Pushkin Museum
 Polish Sculpture Center
 Muzeum Sztuki w Radomiu

References

External links
 

20th-century Polish painters
20th-century Polish male artists
21st-century Polish painters
21st-century male artists
Polish photographers
Polish sculptors
Polish male sculptors
Polish performance artists
1939 births
Living people
20th-century sculptors
People from Łowicz County
Polish male painters